Bahr may refer to:
Bahr, Iran, village in Bushehr Province, Iran
 Bahr, village near Straßburg, now: Barr, Bas-Rhin, Alsace, France
Bahr, Netherlands, hamlet in Gelderland, Netherlands
Bahr (surname)
Bahr (toponymy), a component of Arabic placenames meaning "sea" or "large river"

See also
Bähr, a German surname
Bahrs, a seafood restaurant in New Jersey, US
Baar (disambiguation)